Irosu Amiedi which means Banga Rice in Nigerian pidgin is a traditional Nigerian food prepared with palm fruit like in palm nut soup. The dish originated from the Urhobo people of southern Nigeria.  Banga is the juice extracted from palm nut fruit. It is called Banga rice after the juice extracted from the palm nut is cooked with parboiled white rice. 

The Urhobo people  do not add special spices like; Taiko, Benetientien, and Rogoje to the Banga rice  when they prepare the dish like they do when preparing Banga Soup.

Ingredients; 

 Rice
 Palmnut
 Seasoning cubes
 Salt
 Crayfish
 Fresh pepper
 Onions

See also
 Jollof rice
 Rice and peas
 Fried rice
 Coconut rice

References 

Nigerian cuisine
Igbo cuisine